Irwin Gage (September 4, 1939 – April 12, 2018) was an American pianist, specializing in accompanying Lieder.

Biography 
Born in Cleveland, Ohio, Gage studied piano, musicology and literature at the University of Michigan and Yale, and later with Erik Werba at the Vienna Music Academy. He performed as a soloist, but above all was a collaborator with singers such as Elly Ameling, Arleen Auger, Walter Berry, Brigitte Fassbaender, Dietrich Fischer-Dieskau, Gundula Janowitz, Christa Ludwig, Edda Moser, Jessye Norman, Dagmar Pecková, Lucia Popp, Hermann Prey, Christine Schäfer, Peter Schreier. From his work with such international elite singers numerous award-winning recordings emerged.

In 1970, he planned and accompanied an entire series of Lieder recitals at the Vienna Konzerthaus. From 1979 to 2005, Gage headed a song interpretation class at the Academy of Music and Theater in Zurich (now Zurich University of the Arts). In 2001, he was also appointed to a professorship for song interpretation at the Saarbrücken Music Academy, where he initiated a nationally unique program entitled "Song Duo."

Irwin Gage gave master classes in Europe, Japan, and the United States. He was a consultant and artistic director of concert series at various houses, including the Cologne Philharmonic. He sat on many juries for singing, song duo, chamber music, and solo piano at international music competitions.

Death
Gage died in Zurich, Switzerland on April 12, 2018, after a long period of physical impairment and illness. He was 78.

References

External links 
 

1939 births
2018 deaths
Classical accompanists
Academic staff of the Zurich University of the Arts
University of Michigan School of Music, Theatre & Dance alumni
Musicians from Cleveland
20th-century American pianists
American male pianists
20th-century American male musicians